Azariah ( ‘Ǎzaryāh, "Yah has helped") was a high priest mentioned in the Hebrew Bible (2 Chronicles 26) at the time of King Uzziah's leprosy (c. 751 – 740 BCE).

External links
 

8th-century BCE High Priests of Israel
Books of Chronicles people